Chinedu Okoli (born 23 November 1983), better known by his stage name Flavour N'abania or simply Flavour, is a Nigerian singer. He began his musical career as a drummer for a local church. Flavour is popularly known across Africa and the world for his hit song "Nwa Baby (Ashawo Remix)". He is currently signed to 2nite Entertainment.

In 2005, he released his self-titled debut album N'abania. In 2010, Flavour released his second studio album, Uplifted. It was supported by the singles "Nwa Baby (Ashawo Remix)", "Adamma", and "Oyi Remix". The album's success made Flavour one of Africa's most sought out artists. He was booked to perform at numerous concerts and social events following Uplifteds release.

Early life
Flavour, who is well known for his ability to sing fluently in the Igbo language, was born in Enugu State, Nigeria. His family is originally from Umunze in Orumba South LGA, Anambra State, Nigeria. Flavour began his music career at the age of 13 when he started playing the drums for his church choir in Enugu. The resident pastor at his church introduced him to a friend, Chris I. Ordor, the CEO of SoundCity Communications.

In 1996, Flavour was invited to join the company on an educational scholarship to study music. 

After three years of playing the drums, Flavour started playing the drums professionally. In 1999, he moved on from playing the drums and started playing the keyboard. He also used to provide back-up vocals for other musicians at SoundCity.

Career

Career beginnings
At age 19, Flavour emerged into Nigeria's musical scene as a drummer and pianist for a local band in Enugu. After learning to play drums professionally, Flavour received an offer to perform at City Centre, Enugu. The massive crowd there inspired him to gain new grounds and reach great heights. Flavour's educational background in music enabled him to learn music production from Dekumzy, Isi Charles and Nnachie.

2005: N'abania
In 2005, Flavour released his debut album N'abania through Obaino Music. The album's success was relative and limited to Eastern Nigeria, particularly Enugu State. Flavour collaborated with Mr Raw on the album's lead single titled "N'abania". The song was recorded at Kingsley Ogoro's music studio in Lagos, Nigeria.

2010: Uplifted
Following the relative success of his debut album, Flavour released Uplifted in 2010. The album broke national barriers. Lolhiphop Records, an established record label in South Africa, released the album after popular demand. The album's top singles include "Nwa Baby (Ashawo Remix)", "Adamma", and Oyi Remix" featuring Tiwa Savage.

2012: Blessed
Blessed was released on 18 October 2012 through 2nite Entertainment and iROCKING LTD. The album is the successor to Uplifted. It is arguably Flavour's biggest album to date due to the number of producers who worked on it. It was launched on the same day of Flavour's 2nite Club grand opening.

In an interview with iROKTV, Flavour said: "I think I'm growing. This is my third album... Now it's time to give them the music, like define myself. I have to be more mature with my music, lyrics and instrumentation wise. I worked with tons of producers and the whole production process made sense."

2014: Thankful
Thankful was released in December 2014. The album consists of 22 tracks and runs for one hour seventeen minutes. Receiving generally positive reviews from music critics, it sold thousands of copies. The album features hit tracks such as the love ballad "Ololufe" featuring Chidinma and the fast-tempo Afro-pop song "Wake Up" feat. Wande Coal.

2017: Ijele – The Traveler
Ijele – The Traveller was released in 2017. The album contains 17 tracks, including one featuring Flavour's adopted son Semah G Weifur, a blind Liberian child who was spotted singing alone in a classroom,.

2018
In 2018 Flavour issued two singles, "Crazy love", joining forces with Mama Africa Yemi Alade as Flavour Nabania, and "Yemi Alade". 

Later that year, he released the traditional song "Awele", featuring the Igbo traditional duo Umu Obiligbo.

2020 
On December 4 2020, Flavour released his seventh studio album, titled Flavour of Africa, which has 16 tracks.

Controversy 
On 29 August 2012, Nigerian Entertainment Today reported that Flavour was involved in a legal battle with Ghanaian duo Wutah, over the alleged theft of "Kwarikwa". According to the article, "Kwarikwa" is an exact replica of "Kotosa", a song made by the aforementioned duo. The singing duo accused Flavour of stealing their song's rhythm, chorus, and tempo.

Discography
 N'abania (2005)
 Uplifted (2010)
 Blessed (2012)
 Thankful (2014)
 Ijele the Traveler (2017)
 Awele (2018)
 Flavour of Africa (2020)

Singles

Videography

Awards and nominations

See also

 List of Nigerian musicians

References

Igbo-language singers
Living people
1983 births
Musicians from Enugu State
Nigerian male singer-songwriters
The Headies winners
Nigerian drummers
Nigerian guitarists
Nigerian hip hop singers
Igbo highlife musicians
21st-century guitarists
21st-century drummers
21st-century Nigerian  male singers